Cajuína is a non-alcoholic, non-carbonated beverage made of blended cashew apples. It is traditional in the northeast region of Brazil, especially in the states of Ceará and Piauí.

It was invented by writer and pharmacist Rodolfo Teófilo in the 1890s, who sought to find a healthier alternative to alcoholic beverages. Cajuína is produced by Appert's method—that is, heating clarified cashew juice in a sealed container. The caramelization of its sugars gives cajuína its flavor and distinctive golden color. The process also sterilizes the beverage, allowing it to be stored for long periods.

Somewhat confusingly, a cashew-flavored carbonated soda is also popularly known as cajuína in Ceará and Piauí.

References

Further reading

 
 

Brazilian brands
Brazilian cuisine
Soft drinks